The Primetime Emmy Award for Picture Editing for Variety Programming is awarded to one television series each year. From 2012 to 2015, the category was called Outstanding Picture Editing for Short-Form Segments and Variety Specials. Prior to 2012, short-form segments and variety specials competed independently of one another.

In the following list, the first titles listed in gold are the winners; those not in gold are nominees, which are listed in alphabetical order. The years given are those in which the ceremonies took place.

Winners and nominations

Outstanding Videotape Editing for a Limited Series or a Special

1970s

1980s

Outstanding Editing for a Miniseries or a Special (Multi-Camera Production)

1990s

Outstanding Multi-Camera Picture Editing for a Miniseries, Movie or a Special

2000s

Outstanding Picture Editing for a Special (Single or Multi-Camera)

2010s

Outstanding Picture Editing for Short-Form Segments and Variety Specials

Outstanding Picture Editing for Variety Programming

2020s

Programs with multiple awards

5 wins
 Last Week Tonight with John Oliver

2 wins
 A Black Lady Sketch Show
 The Daily Show with Jon Stewart

Programs with multiple nominations

12 nominations
 Last Week Tonight with John Oliver

5 nominations
 The Colbert Report
 The Daily Show with Jon Stewart
 Jimmy Kimmel Live!

4 nominations
 Conan
 Drunk History
 Saturday Night Live

3 nominations
 American Idol

2 nominations
 A Black Lady Sketch Show
 Carpool Karaoke
 The Daily Show with Trevor Noah
 Dancing with the Stars
 Key & Peele
 Late Show with David Letterman

Notes

References

Picture Editing for Variety Programming